Marilyn John is an American politician serving as a member of the Ohio House of Representatives from the 2nd district. John previously served as the mayor of Shelby, Ohio and was a member of the Richland County Commission.

Early life and education
Growing up, John was encouraged to participate in politics by her family while attending Plymouth High School. After graduating, she enrolled in an associate's program at North Central State College and an MBA program at Ashland University. She later founded the Leader Richland program to prepare elementary school students for a college setting. In recognition of her efforts, John was the recipient of the 2019 OACC Distinguished Alumnus Award.

Career
After earning her MBA, John began working as an underwriter at Shelby Insurance Company and as the executive director of the Shelby Senior Center. She was then elected mayor of Shelby, Ohio after defeating Cohen Lewis and Bill Freytag in the general election with 1,120 votes. During her first term as mayor, John said she would prioritize improving communications within the administration and between the city and community. She was re-elected for a second term in 2011 before resigning in 2014 to accept her election as Richland County commissioner. Prior to her resignation, she was the recipient of the Elected Official of the Year Award by the Area Agency on Aging.

During her tenure as Richland County commissioner, John helped establish a "rainy day" fund, stabilized carryover funds, and create a five-year capital improvements plan. Before her term as commissioner expired, John was elected to the Ohio House of Representatives on November 3, 2020, after defeating Sam Grady. She assumed office on January 4, 2021.

Personal life
John and her husband Kevin have two children together and attend Crossroads Community Church. While living in Miami County, she taught yoga at a fitness studio for four years.

References

External links

Living people
Republican Party members of the Ohio House of Representatives
21st-century American politicians
21st-century American women politicians
Women state legislators in Ohio
Ashland University alumni
Mayors of places in Ohio
Women mayors of places in Ohio
People from Shelby, Ohio
Year of birth missing (living people)